Qazi Abdur Rehman Amritsari (Urdu: قاضی عبد الرحمن امرتسری) was a school teacher and Urdu language author and poet. He was born in 1908 in Amritsar, British India. He was the person who proposed the name of the new capital of Pakistan, Islamabad, in 1959.

According to a history book by Muhammad Ismail Zabeeh, Qazi Abdur Rehman Amritsari proposed the name of the city. The Government of Pakistan confirmed on 11 March 1960 that the name of Islamabad is proposed by Qazi Abdur Rehman Amritsari in a letter sent to him by the Federal Capital Commission.
He received his primary education in the government high school in Amritsar and then studied at the Government Islamia College in Lahore. After migration in 1947 he worked as a school teacher in the Sahiwal District.

He retired in 1968 and died on 25 April 1990 in Arif Wala, Punjab, Pakistan without receiving the promised plot.

Writing career
He used to write in Daily Nawaiwaqat newspaper.

Books
Hawaiy Taibba نعتیہ شعری مجموعہ ’ہوائے طیبہ‘

See also
Choudhry Rahmat Ali

References

1908 births
1990 deaths
20th-century Pakistani historians
Pakistani male journalists
Pakistan Movement activists